Bordelois was a  56-gun ship of the line of the French Navy, lead ship of her class. She was funded by a don des vaisseaux donation from the city of Bordeaux, and built by engineer Léon Guignace on a design by Antoine Groignard. Complete too late to serve in the Seven Years' War, she was razéed into a frigate and used as an East Indiaman. She was rebuilt into a frigate to serve in the War of American Independence. Captured by HMS Romney, she was brought into British service as HMS Artois.

Career 
Bordelois was commissioned in July 1763 under Captain Charles de Cornick-Duchène, arriving in Rochefort on 6 September after the end of the Seven Years' War. In 1768, she was razéed to a large frigate, while her spare timber was used to rebuild .

From 1776 to 1778, Bordelois was used as an East Indiaman, after which she became a hulk in Lorient.

In 1779, on the background of the Franco-American alliance, Bordelois was sold and razéed into a 40-gun frigate; her refitting having been financed by the States of Artois, she was renamed to États d'Artois . She entered drydock in June 1779, to be launched  in January 1780 and commissioned  in May 1780.

She participated in the Battle of Dogger Bank. "Artois was the finest frigate then known; had 28 18-pounders on her main deck with in addition to her complement of guns, heavy carronades on the quarterdeck and forecastle; Manned by 300 men".

Notes and references

Notes

References

External links
 

Ships of the line of the French Navy
Frigates of the French Navy
1763 ships
Don des vaisseaux
Bordelois-class ships of the line